Bosnia and Herzegovina sent a delegation to compete at the 2008 Summer Paralympics in Beijing, China. It was their fourth appearance in the Paralympic Games. Bosnian athletes competed in athletics, shooting and volleyball.

Medallists
The country won one medal, a silver.

Sports

Athletics

Men's field

Women's field

Shooting

Volleyball

The men's volleyball team won the silver medal after being defeated by Iran in the gold medal final. This was the second time that the Bosnian team got defeated in a gold medal match since Sydney 2000.

Players
Safet Alibasic
Sabahudin Delalic
Mirzet Duran
Esad Durmisevic
Ismet Godinjak
Dzevad Hamzic
Ermin Jusufovic
Hidaet Jusufovic
Zikret Mahmic
Adnan Manko
Asim Medic
Ejub Mehmedovic

Tournament

Semifinal

Gold medal match

See also
Bosnia and Herzegovina at the Paralympics
Bosnia and Herzegovina at the 2008 Summer Olympics

External links
International Paralympic Committee

References 

Nations at the 2008 Summer Paralympics
2008
Summer Paralympics